Happy Families  is a series of children's books written by Allan Ahlberg, . Ahlberg worked with a number of illustrators and the books were published by Puffin Books. The series form a transition for children between picture books and chapter books. It is a popular series, having sold in excess of 2.6 million copies since its launch in 1980.

Media 
A children's TV series based on the books, also called Happy Families, was produced by the BBC in the late 1980s.

Titles
Master Money the Millionaire, illustrated by Andre Amstutz
Master Bun the Bakers' Boy, illustrated by Fritz Wegner
Mrs Lather's Laundry, illustrated by Andre Amstutz 
Mr Creep the Crook, illustrated by Andre Amstutz 
Miss Jump the Jockey, illustrated by Andre Amstutz 
Master Track's Train, illustrated by Andre Amstutz 
Master Salt the Sailors' Son, illustrated by Andre Amstutz
Mr and Mrs Hay the Horse, illustrated by Colin McNaughton
Miss Brick the Builders' Baby, illustrated by Colin McNaughton
Mrs Jolly's Joke Shop, illustrated by Colin Mcnaughton
Mr Buzz the Beeman, illustrated by Faith Jaques
Miss Dose the Doctors' Daughter*, illustrated by Faith Jaques
Mr Tick the Teacher, illustrated by Faith Jaques
Mrs Wobble the Waitress, illustrated by Janet Ahlberg
Mr Biff the Boxer, illustrated by Janet Ahlberg
Mr Cosmo the Conjuror, illustrated by Joe Wright
Mrs Plug the Plumber, illustrated by Joe Wright
Miss Dirt the Dustman's Daughter, illustrated by Tony Ross
Mrs Vole the Vet, illustrated by Emma Chichester Clark
Ms Cliff the Climber, illustrated by Fritz Wegner

Notes

Books by Janet and Allan Ahlberg
Series of books
Lists of children's books
20th-century books
Book series introduced in 1980
Puffin Books books